Julian Weiskopf (born 20 November 1993) is an Austrian footballer who plays for FC Kufstein.

External links
 
 

Austrian footballers
Association football goalkeepers
2. Liga (Austria) players
FC Wacker Innsbruck (2002) players
1993 births
Living people